Danny Katz (born 1963) is a Canadian-born, Jewish Australian columnist and author who writes for The Age and the Sydney Morning Herald. His column was syndicated in The West Australian until its unexplained removal in 2016.  He is the Modern Guru in the Good Weekend magazine. He is also known as the author of the award-winning children's book series, Little Lunch, published by Black Dog Books and features illustrations by Mitch Vane, which has been adapted into television series Little Lunch.

External links
 Harper Collins
 Opinion Column
 Once Upon A Tram Ride

Living people
Canadian emigrants to Australia
Canadian male journalists
Australian journalists
Jewish Australian writers
Jewish Canadian journalists
1963 births